The 1999 DFS Classic was a women's tennis tournament played on grass courts at the Edgbaston Priory Club in Birmingham in the United Kingdom that was part of Tier III of the 1999 WTA Tour. The tournament was held from 7 June until 13 June 1999. Fifth-seeded Julie Halard-Decugis won the singles title.

Finals

Singles

 Julie Halard-Decugis defeated  Nathalie Tauziat, 6–2, 3–6, 6–4
 It was Halard-Decugis' second title of the year and the 10th of her career.

Doubles

 Corina Morariu /  Larisa Neiland defeated  Alexandra Fusai /  Inés Gorrochategui, 6–4, 6–4

Entrants

Seeds

Other entrants
The following players received wildcards into the singles main draw:
  Julie Pullin
  Louise Latimer
  Joanne Ward

The following players received wildcards into the doubles main draw:
  Julie Pullin /  Lorna Woodroffe
  Surina de Beer /  Samantha Smith

The following players received entry from the singles qualifying draw:

  Alicia Molik
  Alexandra Stevenson
  Kerry-Anne Guse
  Jelena Dokić
  Miriam Schnitzer
  Jana Kandarr
  Inés Gorrochategui
  Erika deLone

External links
 1999 DFS Classic draws
 ITF tournament edition details

DFS Classic
Birmingham Classic (tennis)
DFS Classic
DFS Classic
1999 in English tennis